Delaware Speedway is a half-mile paved race track that is one of the oldest continuously operating tracks in Canada. It is located a few minutes west of London, Ontario northeast of Delaware, Ontario. It hosts stock car racing every Friday night during the summer. The track opened in 1952 as a quarter-mile dirt track that was paved in 1960. In August 1969, the track was expanded to a 1/2 mile paved oval and continues today.

Divisions 
The track hosts four different divisions as part of its home classes (Late Model, Super Stock, V8 Stock, Bone Stock). They also host the King of the Hill spectators races.

Late Model 

Late Models are purpose-built race cars. They are the fastest weekly class at the speedway and drivers in the series make occasional trips to other speedways in the province for large special events or tour the province with the APC United Late Model Series. The signature event for the Late Models is "The Great Canadian Race" held annually.

Super Stock 

This class is made up of mid-1970s through mid-1980s North American vehicles. The cars are sometimes described as "The Late Model of Yesterday" in reference to their similar look to the old Late Model class. The cars have been modified with safety and performance in mind. The division was known as the "Street Stock" class until its name was changed to "Super Stock" several races into the 2007 season. The change occurred as a result of gradual improvements to the quality of the cars in recent years and the signing of a new sponsor to the division. The speedway announced that more modern muscle car body packages will be introduced for the 2011 season including Dodge Challenger, Chevrolet Camaro, and Ford Mustang.

V8 Stock

The V8 Stock division is one of the newest at Delaware Speedway, however the series has roots dating far back into the track's history with the Enduro Series, which thrived in the 80's and 90's. After the collapse of the Enduro series, the V8 Stock division was born as a weekly series. These full bodied stock cars and trucks have in a way taken over where the Street Stock division was in the 90's before its evolution to the Super Stocks. In recent years the V8 Stock Series has seen car counts grow to record numbers with more drivers entering from the Bone Stocks. In 2019 the Division was combined with the V8 Truck division, allowing drivers to compete with an array of V8 style vehicles.

Bone Stocks 

In an effort to create an easy entry level and add additional entertainment value to the track, the speedway announced in the 2008 Rule package the introduction of a 4-cylinder "Chaos Car". The division was developed by track announcer John Houghton. The class ran in "Novelty" type events before Enduro races and occasionally at the conclusion of the Friday program. Over ten different vehicles were entered into competition in the first year. Race courses included "barrel turns" where drivers had to drive 360 degrees around a barrel before continuing, weaving cones, stop boxes as well as small launch ramps in the season finale. The inaugural "Chaos Car" champion in 2008 was "SnotRod", built by Mark Thyssen and piloted by Tyssen Toll. In 2009, Spencer Rabideau in "Bush Bomb" claimed the title at the season finale in which nine drivers competed. The car count held steady into the beginning of the 2010 season, which finished the year with 12 vehicles competing in the finale in which the championship was won by "Blue Thunder". The 2011 season built on the success regularly starting more than 10 drivers and finishing the year with 15 drivers at the season finale.

The series experienced the largest single-day growth of a division in speedway history with the introduction of the "Bone Stock" format, which updated the Chaos Car rules to fit an old-school 1990's Enduro-type race. The Bone Stock 75 made its debut on October 15, 2011, in which 30 drivers arrived to compete, nearly doubling the size of the division.

Junior Racing League 
The Junior Racing League races on Wednesday nights on a special roadcourse in the infield. The drivers (aged 8–17) years old race 1/2 scale late model stock cars. The program was formerly known as the "CASCAR Junior Program" and was founded in 1997. Racing is divided into two divisions - Junior (8–12 years old) and Senior (13–17 years old). The program has seen many drivers graduate to higher divisions in racing, including J. R. Fitzpatrick.

History

Opening (1952) 
The track was opened in 1952 by Hugh Brodie as a 1/4 mile dirt track and operated as such until it became a 1/4 paved oval in 1960. Expansion to its present-day 1/2 mile paved track configuration took place in 1969.

Super Modifieds (1970s) 
The 1/2 Mile asphalt surface is said to have been specifically built to accommodate super modified racing. The "Supers" raced at the speedway from the 1970s through the 1980s before being dropped from the racing card and replaced with Super Late models. Super Modified racing did not return to Delaware Speedway until 2006 when the International Supermodified Association (ISMA) touring series made a stop. The series continues to attend the track each season, currently running two-day race weekends.

CASCAR era (1981–2005) 
The history of CASCAR and Delaware Speedway are very closely connected together. Delaware is widely recognized as the "Birthplace of CASCAR". The promoter of CASCAR, Tony Novotny was simultaneously promoter of both CASCAR Operations and Delaware Speedway before selling the track in 2001.

The track hosted CASCAR Super Series races from 1986 until 2005 when Delaware Speedway dropped CASCAR from its schedule in the same year the track left the NASCAR Dodge Weekly Series after a two-year membership. The reason for the drop was delays in the delivery of the CASCAR schedule, prompting Delaware to fill the 2 annual CASCAR dates with its own events. Observers also cited strained relations between the track and CASCAR over the series' operations being controlled by its impending buyer NASCAR. All of the CASCAR Super Series' races in 1986 were held at the track, Ken Johnston was the champion.

NASCAR Dodge Weekly Series (2004–2005) 

Delaware Speedway became the first Canadian track to be a member of the NASCAR Dodge Weekly Series in the 2004 season. At the conclusion of the 2005 racing season, the speedway cancelled its NASCAR sanctioning at the same time as it dropped its CASCAR Super Series events. During the period after a series of rainouts and under the NASCAR rules at the time, the speedway was forced to run a number of double feature nights to make the minimum number of races required under the NASCAR program. With double feature nights increasing the weekly payout and not increasing the number of fans, the speedway reconsidered its place within NASCAR.

Independent period (2006–2008) 

Following the end of NASCAR sanctioning the speedway management set about a focus on building the profile of its weekly racing programs. The track worked with the Ontario-based inter-speedway organization Weekend Warrior Series (WWS) in an attempt to increase travel between Ontario-based speedways and also introduced new Late Model events such as the annual Canada Day PartSource 140 and giving the former CASCAR 300-lap Labour Day race to the division.

At the beginning of the 2007 racing season the track General Manager and Operations Director resigned from the speedway. Jeff Wilcox was put in place as Operations Manager and the 2007 race season went ahead as scheduled. Wilcox would remain operations manager until the conclusion of his term at the end of the 2008 racing season.

New ownership and return to NASCAR (2009–2011) 

On January 21, 2009, the speedway formally announced that one of the business's part owners, Arlen Scherba, had bought out the other business partners to become the sole owner of the speedway business. In the same release, the track announced its return NASCAR weekly sanctioning under the NASCAR Whelen All-American Series banner. The release also indicated that the speedway land lease was no longer a concern.

A new operations manager had been put in place before the new year, Paul Houghton, who had previously directed the track's Junior Racing League (JRL) program. Jeff Wilcox continued his role as Race Director, and John Houghton continued as Public Relations manager. Joe Czernai would later be added as the track's general manager, part way through the season.

The speedway successfully executed its first NASCAR Canadian Tire Series event on Saturday, June 6, 2009, and repeated the event one year later on June 5, 2010. D. J. Kennington was the winner of both events. The 2009 season also featured numerous track renovations including repaving the majority of the front stretch, new corner lights, and electronic timing and scoring as well as a new ticketing system.

The 2010 Delaware Speedway season schedule was similar to that of 2009, with the addition of a special Summer Showdown featuring NASCAR drivers Kyle Busch, David Reutimann, and Jason Leffler. The event was won by Kyle Busch and was his first win in Canada. The 2010 schedule reduced the Open Wheel Modified series to a smaller schedule as part of retooling efforts for the weekly program, while increasing the number of races for Late Models, Super Stocks, and Trucks.

In 2011, the track hosted a NASCAR Whelen Modified event in September. It also announced plans to expand seating capacity by 600 and replace a number of grandstands to accommodate larger events, but the installation of those grandstands was put on hold shortly after the announcement to make additional preparations. Ron Sheridan, champion in the track's Late Model class, took over as race director in December 2010.

DeMelo–Spivak partnership (2012–2021) 

On December 1, 2011, Arlen Scherba withdrew as owner of the track and the DeMelo and Spivak families became owners of the speedway. The change in ownership was considered historically significant as it represented the first time the lease-holding Spivak family was to have a direct interest in the speedway business.

The Delaware Group (2021–Present) 

Delaware Speedway has been a staple in Canadian motorsports and stock car racing since 1952, hosting some of the country's top touring series and weekly racing talent for nearly 70 years. The half-mile paved oval is one of Canada's oldest operating racetracks and is located just minutes to the west of London, Ontario.

A new ownership group, The Delaware Group, consisting of Walt Spivak, Jon Aarts (John Aarts Group/J-AAR) and the United Racing Series (Ivor Jones, John Jones, Steve Drake and Luke Ramsay) will oversee the famous track moving forward with Russ Urlin managing operations under the role of General Manager. Luke Ramsay will assume the position of President of Delaware Speedway with Darryl Timmermans in the role of Competition Director. The United Racing Series marketing and management team is set to promote the speedway.

The new ownership group has plans in place to significantly invest in the facility including racetrack surface upgrades that will begin at the conclusion of the 2021 race season and be complete for the start of the 2022 race season. Additional facility upgrades will take place throughout the season and into the 2022 race season.

The next chapter for the historic half-mile is set to be a major one with the ownership group planning major events and upgrades to the facility and operations. Weekly racing will return to the speedway in 2021 after the 2020 race season was cancelled due to the pandemic. Touring series, including the United Racing Series & NASCAR Pinty's Series, will have events at Delaware Speedway in 2021 to race alongside the weekly series.

Former Major Race Series
NASCAR Whelen Modified Tour (2011)
ARCA Lincoln Welders Truck Series (2005-2006)
CASCAR Super Series (1986-2005)
ARCA Series (1987-1992)

References

https://delawarespeedway.com/
http://www.apcracingseries.com/
https://lfpress.com/sports/local-sports/apc-united-racing-series-back-on-track-at-delaware-speedway
https://delawarespeedway.com/2021/06/nascar-pintys-series-returns-to-delaware/
https://www.nascar.ca/

External links

 Delaware Speedway Speedway Official Site
 Delaware Speedway race results at Racing-Reference
  Delaware Speedway Official Site

Motorsport venues in Ontario
Paved oval racing venues in Ontario
Stock car racing
CASCAR
NASCAR tracks
ARCA Menards Series tracks